Bonar Creek was a creek in Mimico, Ontario, Canada. It was a tributary of the still-existing Mimico Creek, a watercourse that empties into Lake Ontario.

The creek is named for Irish immigrants Bill and Letitia Bonar who lived in a pumphouse near the waterway.

Almost the entire creek has been buried, except for a short stretch where the former watercourse joined Mimico Creek, and that remaining portion has been canalized. There are plans to restore part of the wetlands at the confluence of the two creeks.

See also  
List of rivers of Ontario

References

Rivers of Toronto